The Accademia di Belle Arti dell'Aquila is an academy of fine arts located in L'Aquila, Italy. It was founded in 1969.

References

External links
  

 

Art schools in Italy
Education in Abruzzo
L'Aquila
Educational institutions established in 1969
1969 establishments in Italy